Dybbølsbro is a central S-train station in Copenhagen, Denmark.

History
The station opened on 1 November 1934 when S-train service was extended from København H to Valby. A fourth platform was inaugurated in 2009.

Platforms
The four platforms are located under Dybbølsbro, a viaduct connecting Kalvebod Brygge and Havneholmen with the rest of Vesterbro across the railway tracks. They are accessed from the bridge with stairs or lifts.

Bus station
There is as of 2020 not any proper bus station for scheduled long-distance buses. They stop at a sidewalk on Ingerslevsgade, a street between Dybbølsbro and the København H.

In March 2020 the city decided to build a bus station near Dybbølsbro station.

See also
 List of railway stations in Denmark

References

External links

S-train (Copenhagen) stations
Railway stations opened in 1934
Vesterbro, Copenhagen
1934 establishments in Denmark
Railway stations in Denmark opened in the 20th century